Mac Mini (stylized as Mac mini) is a small form factor desktop computer developed and marketed by Apple Inc. , it is positioned between the consumer all-in-one iMac and the professional Mac Studio and Mac Pro as one of four current Mac desktop computers. Since launch, it has shipped without a display, keyboard, and mouse. The machine was initially branded as "BYODKM" (Bring Your Own Display, Keyboard, and Mouse) as a strategic pitch to encourage users to switch from Windows and Linux computers.

In January 2005, the original Mac Mini was introduced with the PowerPC G4 CPU. In February 2006, Apple announced the a new Intel Core Solo model with more advanced components. A thinner unibody redesign, unveiled in June 2010, added an HDMI port, and was more readily positioned as a home theater device and an alternative to the Apple TV.

The 2018 Space Gray Mac Mini model has Thunderbolt, an Intel Core i5 or i7 CPU, and also changed the case's default silver for space gray. This model also has solid-state storage and replaces most of the data ports with USB-C sockets. The Apple silicon Mac Mini was introduced in November 2020 in the original silver style; the 2018 space gray model remained available as a high-end model with more RAM options.

A server version of the Mac Mini that is bundled with the Server edition of the OS X operating system was offered from 2009 to 2014. The Mac Mini received generally tepid reviews except for the Apple silicon model, which was praised for its compatibility, performance, processor, price, and power efficiencies, though it drew some occasional criticisms for its ports, speaker, integrated graphics, non-user-upgradable RAM and storage, and the expensive cost to buy associated accessories and displays.

Form and design 

The Mac Mini was modeled on the shape of a standard digital media player, and runs the macOS operating system (previously Mac OS X and OS X). It was initially advertised as "BYODKM" (Bring Your Own Display, Keyboard, and Mouse), aiming to expand Apple's market-share of customers using other operating systems such as Microsoft Windows and Linux. Mac Mini was the company's only consumer computer that shipped without a paired display, keyboard, and mouse since its original release in 2005.

A removable panel was attached to the bottom of the chassis of the Mac Minis to allow for Random Access Memory (RAM) upgrades for the third and the fourth models. The cases does not void the product warranty and broken pieces were not covered. Since the unibody redesign in 2010, the Kensington Security Slot and the optical drive were removed from all models, leaving internal storage spaces for either a second internal hard drive or an SSD, which can be ordered from Apple or as an upgrade kit from third party suppliers.

G4 Polycarbonate (2005) 

Apple's release of a small form factor computer had been widely speculated upon and requested before the Mac Mini. In January 2005, the Mac Mini G4 was introduced alongside the iPod shuffle at the Macworld Conference & Expo; Apple CEO Steve Jobs marketed "The cheapest, and most affordable Mac ever". The machine was intended as an entry-level computer for budget-minded customers. In comparison to regular desktops, which use standard-sized components such as 3.5-inch hard drives and full-size DIMMs, the Mac Mini G4 uses low-power laptop components to fit into small cases and avoid overheating.

The aluminum case, the top and bottom of which is capped with polycarbonate plastic, has an optical drive slot on the front, and the I/O ports and vents for the cooling system on the back. It has an external 85W power supply. Mac Mini G4 has no visible screws, reflecting Apple's intention the computer may not be upgraded by the user. Some Mac Mini owners used a putty knife or a pizza cutter to open the case to install third-party memory, which could be obtained less expensively than Apple's offering.

The Mac Mini G4 is based on a single-core, 32-bit, PowerPC CPU with 512 KB of on-chip L2 cache. The processor, running at 1.25, 1.33, 1.42, or 1.5 GHz depending on the model, accesses memory through a front-side bus clocked at 167 MHz. The CPU can be overclocked to higher frequencies by either soldering or desoldering certain zero-ohm resistors on the logic board.

An ATI Radeon 9200 graphics processor (GPU) with 32 megabytes (MB) of DDR SDRAM was supplied as standard; in the final 2005 model, Apple added a high-end option of 64 MB VRAM. In Apple's early marketing of the Mac Mini G4, it touted the superiority the discrete graphics board over the integrated graphics in many budget PCs.

The machine uses 333 MHz DDR SDRAM and has one desktop-sized DIMM slot for RAM, allowing a maximum of 1 gigabyte (GB) of memory, a relatively small amount that often forced the system to page against the hard drive, slowing operation considerably. The Mac Mini G4 uses a single 2.5-inch Ultra ATA/100 hard drive that offers a maximum transfer rate of 100 megabytes per second (MB/s). It is not possible to open the sealed enclosure to upgrade the hard drive without possibly voiding the warranty of the system. The Mac Mini G4 also contains a second ATA cable that connects to the optical drive. A Combo drive was included as standard while a SuperDrive that could write to DVDs was also an option.

The Mac Mini G4 has two USB 2.0 ports and one FireWire 400 port. Networking is supported with 10/100 Ethernet and a 56k V.92 modem, while 802.11b/g Wi-Fi and Bluetooth were additional, build-to-order options. External displays are supported via a DVI port, and adapters for VGA, S-Video, and composite video output were available. The system contains a built-in speaker and an 1/8-inch stereo mini jack for analog sound output. The new Wi-Fi card no longer used an MMCX-Female connector for the antenna, as do prior models, but rather a proprietary Apple one.

The Mac Mini G4 was initially supplied with Mac OS X 10.3, then later with Mac OS X 10.4, and can run Mac OS 9 applications, as long as a bootable copy of the OS 9 system folder is installed from which to run the Classic environment (although the Mac Mini G4 cannot natively boot to Mac OS 9). As of Mac OS X 10.5, the ability to run the Classic environment was removed. Later, Mac OS 9 was able to run on the Mac Mini G4 through an unofficial patcher, though this was not supported by Apple. It is compatible with operating systems designed for the PowerPC architecture. Users can install the AmigaOS-compatible MorphOS, OpenBSD, and Linux distributions such as Debian and Ubuntu.

Technical specifications 
The serial number and specifications sticker on the underside of the latest revision do not carry the actual specs of the upgrade. For example, on a 1.5 GHz model, 1.42 GHz is listed. The product packaging also did not reflect the upgrade. Apple did not revise the official specifications on their web site.

Intel Polycarbonate (2006–2009) 

In February 2006, Apple announced the first Intel Mac Mini, as part of the Mac's transition to Intel processors. Based on the Intel Core Solo CPU, it is four times faster than its predecessor PowerPC G4. An updated server version of the machine was released in October 2009, having been marketed as an affordable server for small financial and academic uses; this model omitted the optical drive and used a hard drive instead.

The 2006 and 2007 models are fitted with 32-bit Intel Core Solo CPUs that is upgradable with the 64-bit Core 2 Duo processors. The 2006 and 2007 Merom-based Mac Mini models were supplied with socketed CPUs; the 32-bit processor can be removed, and replaced with a compatible 64-bit Intel Core 2 Duo processor. Models manufactured in and after 2009 had their CPUs soldered onto a logic board, preventing its upgradability. The upgrades make the 2006/2007 models perform better than the 2009 models. Geekbench has shown the 2.33 GHz Core 2 Duo fitted Mac Mini with 2 GB of RAM has a score of 3060 whereas a late 2009 Mac Mini with 2 GB of RAM has 3056 making the two machines fairly comparable.

The built-in Intel GMA was criticized for producing stuttering video despite supporting hardware accelerated H.264 video playback, and disappointing frame rates in graphics-intensive 3D games. Early and Late 2009 models corrected these performance issues with an improved NVIDIA-based GeForce 9400M chipset.

The Intel-based Mac Mini includes four USB 2.0 ports and one FireWire 400 port. The I/O ports were changed with the early 2009 revision, adding a fifth USB 2.0 and swapping the FireWire 400 port for a FireWire 800 port. An infrared receiver was added, allowing the use of an Apple Remote. Bluetooth 2.0+EDR and 802.11g Wi-Fi became standard and the Ethernet port was upgraded to Gigabit. A built-in 56k modem was no longer available. The 2009 models added 802.11 draft-n and later 802.11n Wi-Fi, and Bluetooth was upgraded from 2.0 to 2.1. External displays are supported through a DVI port. The 2009 models have Mini-DVI and Mini DisplayPort video output, allowing the use of two displays. The Mini DisplayPort supports displays with a resolution up to 2560×1600, which allows use of the 30-inch Cinema Display. The Intel-based Mac Mini has separate Mini-TOSLINK/3.5 mm mini-jacks that support both analog audio input and output, and optical digital S/PDIF input and output.

Technical specifications

Unibody (2010–2014) 

In June 2010, Apple redesigned the Mac Mini, giving it a more compact, thinner unibody aluminum case that has an internal power supply, an SD card slot, a Core 2 Duo CPU, and a HDMI port for video output that Apple marketed as HDMI 1.4 compliant, replacing the Mini-DVI port of the previous models.

In July 2011, a hardware update was announced; models were now fitted with a Thunderbolt port, dual-core Intel Core i5 and 4-core i7 CPUs, support for up to 16 GB of memory, Bluetooth 4.0, and either an Intel HD Graphics 3000 integrated graphics or an AMD Radeon HD 6630M dedicated graphics. The revision, however, removed the internal CD/DVD optical drive. The server model was upgraded to a quad-core Core i7 processor. Apple updated the line in October 2012, with Ivy Bridge processors, USB 3.0, and upgraded graphics. In October 2014, the line was updated with Haswell processors, improved graphics, 802.11ac Wi-Fi, and Thunderbolt 2 ports, one of which replaced the FireWire 800 port. The price of the base model was lowered by $100. Two holes that were used to open the case were removed from the case because the memory, being soldered to the logic board, was no longer upgradable. Because the integrated GPU does not have its own dedicated memory, the system shares some of the main system memory with it. 4K video output via HDMI was added.

Comparing the high-end models of both releases, the 2012 model has a 4-core, 8-thread Intel Core i7-3720QM whereas the 2014 model has a 2-core, 4-thread Intel Core i7-4578U. The 2014 updated model has Intel Iris graphics (GT3), which greatly outperforms the Intel HD Graphics 4000 (GT2) in the previous models. The 2014 CPUs were more energy-efficient: their maximal thermal design power (TDP) was 62% lower than that of the 2012 models. The 2014 revision underwent internal process transition to dual-core CPUs, performing a lower-quality of multi-threaded workloads compared to the quad-core processors in the 2012 model, though the single-threaded workload interactions speeds increased.

Technical specifications

Space Gray (2018) 

In October 2018, Apple announced a "space gray"-colored Mac Mini with Intel Coffee Lake series CPUs, the T2 series chip for internal security, Bluetooth 5, four Thunderbolt 3 ports with USB 3.1 gen 2 support, two USB 3.0 Type-A ports, and HDMI 2.0. PCIe-based flash storage is standard with no option to fit a hard drive. The baseline storage was changed to 128 GB with a maximum of 2 TB. RAM was increased to a baseline of 8 GB and a maximum of 64 GB of SO-DIMM DDR4. The chassis is a carryover from Mac Minis released between 2010 and 2014, and has the same dimensions, but its color was changed from silver to "space gray", similar to the iMac Pro.

The 2018 Mac Mini removes legacy I/O such as the SD card reader, SATA drive bay, IR receiver, optical S/PDIF (TOSLINK) audio out, and audio in. macOS Catalina added support for Dolby Atmos, Dolby Vision, and HDR10. Memory can again be replaced. According to Apple, memory is not officially user-replaceable, and requires service by an Apple Store or Apple Authorized Service Provider. The CPU and flash storage are soldered to the logic board and cannot be replaced.

In March 2020, Apple doubled the default storage in both base models. Apple discontinued the Core i3 model following the release of the M1 Mac Mini in November 2020, but continued to sell the Core i5/i7 models until January 2023.

Technical specifications

Apple silicon (2020–present) 

As part of the Mac transition to Apple silicon,  Apple announced a new Mac Mini with the Apple M1 chip on November 10, 2020. It was released on November 17, 2020, and was one of the first three Apple silicon-based Macs released (alongside the MacBook Air and MacBook Pro).

With the M1, this Mac Mini has a 3x faster eight-core CPU, a 6x faster GPU, and 15x faster machine learning performance than its predecessor, the base 2018 model. Options for more than 16 GB of RAM are not available on M1-based systems. Support for external displays is reduced to one display over USB-C/Thunderbolt, though a second display can be connected using HDMI; the previous Intel-based model could drive two 4K displays over USB-C/Thunderbolt. On April 20, 2021, 10 Gigabit Ethernet with Lights Out Management was added as a built-to-order option. Its internal cooling system has a thermal-based design that according to Apple performs five times more quickly than the best-selling Windows-based desktop computer in its price range.

The price of the Apple silicon Mac Mini dropped US$100 from that of the previous model to $699. It added support for Wi-Fi 6, USB4, and 6K video output to run the Pro Display XDR. Externally, it is very similar to the 2018 Mac Mini but has a lighter, silver finish similar to that of the models released from 2010 to 2014.

The release of the Apple silicon Mac Mini was preceded by the June 2020 release of the A12Z-based Developer Transition Kit, a prototype with a Mac Mini enclosure made for developers to port their apps to Apple silicon. The 2020 DTK has 16 GB of RAM, 512 GB of storage, and two USB-C ports.

On January 17, 2023, Apple announced updated models based on the M2 and M2 Pro chips. The updated models also include Bluetooth 5.3 and Wi-Fi 6E connectivity. The M2 Pro model includes two additional USB-C/Thunderbolt ports and supports HDMI 2.1.

Technical specifications

Supported operating systems

Reception 
The Mac Mini has been praised as a relatively affordable computer with a solid range of features. Reviews noted it is possible to purchase small computers at the same price with faster CPUs, better graphics cards, more memory, and more storage. The small size has made the Mac Mini particularly popular for home theater use, and its size and reliability has helped keep resale values high.

The G4 models model received a considerably lukewarm score among critics. Those at CNET positively identified it as an affordable, quiet, and compact machine, but they disliked the slow hard drive and that it only had two below-expected quantities of USB 2.0 ports. Ars Technica indicated criticisms on its non-user-upgradable RAM and storage options and the extra expensive fees for additional drives. Overall, they felt that the performance was fairly acceptable.

The Intel polycarbonate model was moderately praised. Engadget aggregated that critics generally praised the Core Duo transition, connectivity, and the Front Row performance. The listed reviewers inspected it to be about a 10 to 15% higher performance boost in media-center-related tasks. CNET admired its cost, software, home-theater system, and Windows compatibility. Despite this, they found criticisms on the poor video output graphic processing units, small hard drive, and the limited remote controllability and upgrade options. Ars Technica encountered it to be somewhat underpowered to play high-resolution HD streams at standard frame rates. They opposed the integrated graphics implemented within the model because it delivered marginal performance when compared to dedicated graphics processors.

The unibody model reviews were tepid. Engadget praised the HDMI port, compact design, and power efficiency. They disputed its lack of Blu-Ray options on home theater and the expensive price. CNET wrote a positive review on the HDMI output and the near-decent graphics capability, citing criticisms on the limited user upgrade options and the high cost. The same sources of criticism were also mentioned in an Ars Technica review.

The space gray model received lukewarm praises. The Verge praised its significant leap of power and speed and the high-quality port integration. They wrote negatively on its high-cost base model and the lack of GPU performance. In an Engadget review, it was admired for its compact design,  versatile port selection, CPU performance, and that it was the least expensive in the Macintosh lineup, while criticisms included the limited GPU performance, expensive upgrade options, and the non-user-upgradable RAM. CNET wrote positively on its high-quality processor performances, the ports, and the Ethernet configuration; they criticized the non-replaceable integrated graphics and the expensive cost to purchase associated accessories and displays.

Reviews for the Apple silicon model were very positive in the media. Wired praised its relatively low-cost affordability and its integration of Apple Silicon; the latter was assessed as efforts of significant performance and power efficiency enhancements. Null experimented the system to be "peppy and responsive" without any crashes; however, he panned the transitional disabilities of the Silicon which discontinued supports for Intel-era system extensions. Similarly, ZDNet wrote positively on the price, processor units, compact design, and quiet performance. Nevertheless, they argued over the expensive non-user-installable RAM and storage upgrades and the non-discrete-or-external GPU. Technical writers Samuel Axon (Ars Technica), Chris Welch (The Verge), and Jeremy Laukkonen (Lifewire) all gave high praises. Axon evaluated a positive grade on its high-quality performance and solid Legacy x86 macOS app compatibilities, citing the RAM and storage installment limitation as his chief element of criticisms. Agreeably, Welch emphasized appeals to the performance and the power efficiencies. In addition, he regarded negatively its external GPU incompatibility, low-quality speaker, and that it has fewer USB-C ports than the previous Intel model. Collectively, Laukkonen recited these debates.

Home theater and server

Home theater 

Due to its similarity, compact volume and functions, the Mac Mini is often used as a home theater PC or as an alternative to the Apple TV. The system has a native interface with Front Row software that is based on the original Apple TV interface. Unlike the Apple TV, the Mac Mini is backward compatible with televisions that have only composite or S-Video inputs.

Pre-2009 models have a video connector that is compatible with DVI, HDMI (video only), SVGA, S-Video, and composite video with appropriate adapters; for audio output, it has both the analog mini-headphone port and a digital optical fiber port. The addition of a HDMI port on the 2010 Mac Mini simplified connection to high-definition televisions and home theater AV receivers. The HDMI port supports video resolutions of up to 1080p and eight-channel, 24-bit audio at 192 kHz, and Dolby Surround 5.1 and stereo output. The 2014 model added 4K output, and the 2018 model supports Dolby Atmos, Dolby Vision, and HDR10, and uses the macOS Catalina operating system.

Server 

Apple offered a server configuration of the Mac Mini that was originally supplied with the OS X Server operating system, a version of OS X, but this was later switched to the standard version of OS X with a separate OS X Server package. The file included component applications such as "Server App" and "File Sharing". In June 2011, it was available from Mac App Store for other Macintosh computers. The Mid 2010 Mac Mini Server was initially the only model without an optical drive, which was replaced with a second hard drive. The Mid 2011 models also eliminated the optical drive.

The Mac Mini Server hardware was discontinued in the Late 2014 model. The macOS Server software package, however, could be purchased from the Mac App Store. In 2018, coinciding with the release of macOS Mojave, Apple shipped macOS Server version 5.71, which stopped bundling open-source services including DHCP, DNS, email, firewall, FTP, RADIUS, VPN, Web, and Wiki. Apple states customers are able to receive support for these services directly from open-source providers. Other Apple-proprietary services such as Airport, Calendar, Contacts, Messages, and NetBoot were also removed with no corresponding open-source options.

Alternative operating systems for Mac users include Linux and virtualized Windows; they can also install third-party Unix packages via open-source package managers such as Conda, Fink, Homebrew, MacPorts, Nix, pkgsrc, and Rudix. A few services, such as caching, files, Time Machine, and Web, were moved to the macOS Mojave client but can have limited configuration capability via the Sharing control panel. The Apache server GUI manager is replaced by apachectl commands in Terminal. The only services remaining in macOS Server 5.7.1 are Open Directory, Profile Manager, and Xsan.

Notes

References

External links 
 
 
 
 

Mini
Computer-related introductions in 2005
Mini
Mini
Mini
Mini
Products introduced in 2005
Mini